The Secret Lie is a 1938 German drama film directed by Nunzio Malasomma and starring Pola Negri, Hermann Braun, and Herbert Hübner.

The film's sets were designed by the art directors  and Erich Czerwonski.

Cast

References

Bibliography

External links 
 

1938 films
1938 drama films
German drama films
Films of Nazi Germany
1930s German-language films
Films directed by Nunzio Malasomma
Terra Film films
German black-and-white films
1930s German films